Arts on the Line was a program devised to bring art into the Massachusetts Bay Transportation Authority (MBTA) subway stations in the late 1970s and early 1980s. Arts on the Line was the first program of its kind in the United States and became the model for similar drives for art across the country.

After the first 20 artworks were installed, Arts on the Line continued facilitating the installation of artwork in or around at least 12 more stations on the MBTA as well as undertaking a temporary art program for stations under renovation, known as "Artstops". Artworks are included in the six new Green Line Extension stations as well.

History

In 1964, the MBTA was created as the successor to the Metropolitan Transit Authority. The purpose of the MBTA was to consolidate transit systems in greater Boston.

The first permanent public artworks on the MBTA were added in 1967. (A temporary exhibition had been held in the Winter Street Concourse in 1960.) 

Before Arts on the Line was implemented, the MBTA did not have a comprehensive or formal arts program. The process for choosing station art was closed, with no public announcement or solicitation to local artists, creating some resentment within the arts community. Artists that were chosen to install works in stations often had disputes with contracts and contractors, and often had problems just getting paid by the MBTA. 

Arts on the Line began with the planning of the Red Line Northwest Extension. Four stations, Harvard, Porter, Davis, and Alewife, were created or remodeled as a part of this mass transit project. In 1977, the MBTA received a $45,000 grant from the Federal Government's Urban Mass Transportation Administration to create a program to install artworks into the new stations, and in 1978 the MBTA and the Cambridge Arts Council (CAC) joined in a partnership to reach this goal.

The Arts on the Line program was developed solely by the CAC and was administered by them as well. Meant to be a response to art installations in subway systems such as the Stockholm Metro, Paris Métro, Montreal Metro, and Moscow Metro, the new Arts on the Line program  became the United States' first arts in transit program, and was to be a "pilot for similar projects in other U.S. cities".

Selection process
From 1979-1980, the Cambridge Arts Council, which was charged with choosing the artworks, went through the artist selection process and selected twenty artworks, five for each station. To select the works, an "arts committee" was formed for each of the stations, and an open call for artists was publicized; over 650 artists submitted proposals.

There were between 10 and 15 people sitting on each selection committee. Each committee had at least one of each of the following: MBTA representatives, community development representatives, members of local historical societies, local residents, business representatives, and an arts administrator.

Each committee had two subgroups, an "advisory board" and an "art panel". The advisory board was tasked with collecting information about the future station and its surroundings. This included design of the station, history of the area, and a profile of future station users.  This information was passed along to the art panel, composed of three people: an artist, an art professional from outside of Massachusetts, and someone who lived near the future station. This panel was the group that actual chose the artworks.

A seven-step process was devised to create a "systematic selection process which would, nevertheless, provide flexibility". The steps were as follows:

 Meetings with art committee
 Meetings with art panel, MBTA, architect, and review of "Artbank"
 Method for artist selection
 Open competition
 Limited competition
 Invitation
 Direct Purchase
 Artists develop proposals
 Artists presentations
 Art committee discusses proposals
 Art panel makes decision 

After the placement of 20 artworks in the four stations of the Northwest Extension, the program was expanded to include the creation of artworks in or around at least 12 more stations on the MBTA.

Installation
In 1985, the first 20 artworks installed under the Arts on the Line program were unveiled. These works comprised the largest collection of art in a United States transit setting, at that time. The total cost of the artworks was $695,000, or one half of one percent of the total construction cost of the Red Line Extension, and was funded partially by a $70,000 National Endowment for the Arts grant. In 1989, the program was awarded a Federal Design Achievement Award by the National Endowment for the Arts, which stated that the project "demonstrates how much art can enrich the everyday experience of the public environment".

The works were almost exclusively made with durable materials (stone, bronze, brick, etc.), and many were placed so that it was physically impossible to reach them without assistance. This was to avoid normal wear and tear as well as vandalism. The works are designed to last 75 years per City of Cambridge standards for public art.

Later works
After completing the installation of artwork on the Red Line Extension, the program was continued in other forms. In 1986, Arts on the Line began a program titled "ArtStops" with the goal of providing artwork to stations under renovation as a way to distract riders from the mess and confusion of the renovation work. These galleries hosted temporary works for 18 months, and each temporary gallery was allotted  to spend on art. In total 21 artists were chosen, each one being given a $3500 stipend to develop and create up to three projects for the station. Forty works were displayed in 1986, with 19 more in 1987. A subway rider at Harvard station stated, "It's worth coming down to the T just for the art". Permanent works were also placed in the renovated stations, including Kendall Band at Kendall/MIT.

By the 1990s, the project was stalled: new artworks were not being added, while kinetic works like Kendall Band were no longer functional. In 2001, the MBTA began a $2.3 million federally-funded program to install ten new works and restore 21 of the 72 existing pieces. The centerpiece of the program was Totems of Light, a pair of stained glass windows at the rebuilt Airport station. Public art on the Green Line Extension was cut during cost-cutting in 2015, but later re-added.

Removal of artworks
In 1993, The Lights at the End of the Tunnel, a large reflective mobile by William Wainwright in the Porter Square station mezzanine was removed, due to a lead weight that fell off.  The location and status of the artwork is unknown .

Since 1985, Omphalos, a large outdoors public art sculpture by Dimitri Hadzi, marked Harvard Square station at the center of the busy intersection.  Structural elements of the sculpture slowly deteriorated unnoticed, until a  piece fell off without warning.  Short of funds and faced with an expensive repair bill, the MBTA considered options to either move or destroy the artwork in August 2013.  By December 2013, the sculpture had  been removed, and its ownership had been transferred to a private developer of housing in Rockport, Massachusetts.  The developer planned to restore and re-install it on a public harbor walk near a new development, with the approval of the artist's widow.

Red Line Northwest Extension artworks
The following is a list of the first 20 artworks created for Arts on the Line, which were all installed along the Red Line Northwest Extension.

† This artwork is no longer installed at the station

References

External links

 MBTA - Arts on the T
 Cambridge Arts Council
 Davis Square Tile Project

 
Massachusetts Bay Transportation Authority
Public art in the United States